The innocent worm lizard (Amphisbaena innocens) is a worm lizard species in the family Amphisbaenidae. It is endemic to Hispaniola.

References

Amphisbaena (lizard)
Reptiles described in 1862
Taxa named by David Friedrich Weinland
Endemic fauna of Hispaniola
Reptiles of the Dominican Republic
Reptiles of Haiti